"Korean Bodega" is a single released in 1999, and was the final single taken from Fun Lovin' Criminals's second album 100% Colombian.

The release of the single was cross-promoted by an electronica version of the song arranged by Garbage, on which singer Shirley Manson performed a guest vocal for the refrain. The new version was part of a remix trade between both bands, where Fun Lovin' Criminals remixed Garbage's single "You Look So Fine" in reciprocation.

Single release

"Korean Bodega" was released by Chrysalis Records on April 26, 1999, and was heavily promoted Garbage's remix, and the fact that Shirley Manson had contributed vocals to the remix. Released on two CD singles and cassette single, the Garbage remix featured on two of the formats, while the original album version on one. It charted at #15 on the UK Singles chart, the most successful single the band had released since "Scooby Snacks" three years earlier.

In the run up the release of Garbage's "You Look So Fine" single on May 24, Mushroom Records released promotional CDs to radio stations featuring both a radio edit of "You Look So Fine" and the reworked Fun Lovin' Criminals version. Much of the print ads for "Korean Bodega" pointed out that "You Look So Fine" and the Fun Lovin Criminals remix would be released the next month, and details of Garbage's single was sent out to fans on both artists mailing lists.

Personnel
Huey Morgan – vocals, guitar
Brian Leiser – bass
Steve Borgovini – drums

Track listings

UK Cassette single Chrysalis

"Korean Bodega"
"Korean Bodega – Aero Mexicana Mix"

UK CD1 Chrysalis 7243 8 86985 0 4 CDCHSS 5108

"Korean Bodega – Aero Mexicana Mix"
"The Fun Lovin' Criminal"
"Big Night Out"
"Big Night Out" (Enhanced Video)

UK CD2 Chrysalis 7243 8 86985 2 8 CDCHS 5108

"Korean Bodega"
"The Ballad Of Larry Davis"
"Sleepyhead"

UK CD Promo Chrysalis CDCHSDJ 5108

"Korean Bodega (Clean Album Version)"
"Korean Bodega (Aero Mexicana Mix – Clean)"

US CD Promo Virgin 7087 6 13669 2 1, DPRO-13669

"Korean Bodega (Clean Version)"
"Korean Bodega (LP Version)"
"Call Out Hook"

Release history

Comprehensive charts

References

External links
Fun Lovin Criminals Myspace profile
"Korean Bodega" page at Last.fm

1999 singles
Fun Lovin' Criminals songs
Trip hop songs
1998 songs
Chrysalis Records singles